= USC Baseball =

USC Baseball may refer to:

- South Carolina Gamecocks baseball, the collegiate baseball program of the University of South Carolina (often referred to as "SC" or "USC" in athletics)
- USC Trojans baseball, the collegiate baseball program of the University of Southern California
